Turn of Faith is a 2001 American crime drama film directed by Charles Jarrott and starring Ray Mancini and Mia Sara.

Plot
The film follows three friends, a cop, a priest and a kid from the neighborhood who wants to handle the family business. Then a man named Philly enters the 
picture and suddenly things become difficult.

Cast
Ray Mancini as Joey
Mia Sara as Annmarie De Carlo
Costas Mandylor as Bobby Giordano
Alan Gelfant as Father Frank
Tom Atkins as Charlie Ryan
Tony Sirico as Jimmy
Charles Durning as Philly

References

External links

2001 films
Films directed by Charles Jarrott
2000s English-language films